Kunturmarka (Quechua kuntur condor, marka village / storey, Hispanicized spelling Condormarca) is an archaeological site in Peru. It is situated in the Pasco Region, Pasco Province, Paucartambo District. The complex consists of round buildings and stone tombs (chullpa).

See also 
 Markapukyu
 Qaqapatan
 Q'illaywasin

References

Archaeological sites in Pasco Region
Archaeological sites in Peru
Tombs in Peru